CarrefourSA Maltepe Park, also known as Maltepe Park, opened on February 12, 2005, is a modern shopping mall in Cevizli neighborhood of Maltepe district in Istanbul, Turkey.

The shopping mall is owned by CarrefourSA, a joint venture of French retail giant Carrefour with the Turkish Sabancı Holding. The cost of the investment totaled to €80 million. The grand opening was performed by the Prime Minister Recep Tayyip Erdoğan.

The mall's parking lot has a capacity for 2,500 cars. Around 1,400 service people are employed in the property.

Renovation and expansion
The shopping mall was renovated and expanded after construction works that lasted 21 months. The number of stores and premises in the food court reached to 250, and the capacity of the parking lot to 3,500. The construction cost 70 million. The shopping mall celebrated its 10th anniversary in January 2015.

See also
 List of shopping malls in Istanbul

References

  Press bulletin from CarrefourSA
 From the Grand Bazaar to the modern shopping centers in Turkey. Turkish Council of Shopping Centers & Retailers (AMPD)

Shopping malls in Istanbul
Maltepe, Istanbul
Shopping malls established in 2005